Tatiana Rusesabagina ( Mukangamije) (born October 24, 1958) is a Rwandan who with her husband Paul Rusesabagina, survived in Hôtel des Mille Collines during the 1994 Rwandan genocide, and saved over a thousand people from being murdered. This story was used as the basis for the 2004 film Hotel Rwanda, in which Tatiana was portrayed by Sophie Okonedo, who was nominated for an Academy Award for Best Supporting Actress for her performance as Tatiana.

Personal life and the genocide
She was born Tatiana Mukangamije in Butare. Her parents were Tutsi and they raised her Catholic. She trained to be a nurse and moved to Ruhengeri.

In 1987, while at a wedding, she met Paul Rusesabagina. At the time, Paul was married to his wife, Esther, and he had three children, daughters Lys and Diane and son Roger. Esther and Paul soon divorced, and in 1989, Tatiana and Paul married. His ex-wife Esther is now deceased and Tatiana is stepmother to their children. They also had a son together, Tresor. She also gave birth to a daughter with Paul, that died a few days after birth. Paul and Tatiana are also the legal guardians of Anais and Karine, who are the children of Tatiana's brother Thomas and his wife Fedens, who had gone missing during 
the genocide against Tutsi in Rwanda

When Tatiana was working as a nurse, she was facing discrimination because of her Tutsi ethnicity, and Paul arranged for her to be transferred to a different location in Kigali, where Paul was the manager of a hotel called the Hôtel des Mille Collines. Tatiana's mother was murdered in the genocide along with other family members and their bodies were thrown into a pit with many others. Her father paid to be killed by shooting, so that he did not have to die a more painful and horrific death. Her father had forged all of her family's identification cards to say that they were Hutu; however, the militia had other ways of tracking who was who. Two of her siblings survived the genocide.

Tatiana's family was targeted specifically because they were Tutsi, which the Hutu people were killing in mass in an attempt to make the Tutsi extinct. The conflict between these two ethnic groups goes back centuries in Rwanda. Paul's family was of mixed Hutu and Tutsi which meant he was not as much of a target as a full blood Tutsi.

Paul was initially at the hotel himself, and later had Tatiana come to the hotel for safety with the children. He tried to smuggle them out of the country hidden in a truck that would take them to the airport, but the militia figured out their plan. Tatiana was a specific target of brutal beatings because the militia knew that she was the Tutsi wife of the hotel manager, and she barely escaped death and made it back to the hotel, where she was bedridden for several days because of her injuries. The people taking shelter inside of the hotel were all saved because of Rusesabagina's careful diplomacy with the government, which included bribing them so they would not enter the hotel and harm anyone.

Once they were able to leave the hotel, Paul and Tatiana went to a refugee camp to begin looking for family. It was there that they were reunited with Tatiana's brother's two daughters, who were starving and covered in dirt when they were found.

Later life
The family escaped to Tanzania and later settled in Brussels, Belgium, where they received frequent threats. Tatiana currently lives in San Antonio, Texas, as Paul did. Paul was given the Presidential Medal of Freedom in 2005 by George W. Bush, with Tatiana by his side. The family is still active as advocates for genocide survivors and for the betterment of the Tutsi people in Rwanda. They created the Hotel Rwanda Rusesabagina Foundation in 2005 whose mission is to "prevent future genocides and raise awareness of the need for a new truth and reconciliation process in Rwanda and the Great Lakes Region of Africa".

Portrayal in media
Tatiana was portrayed by Sophie Okonedo in the 2004 film Hotel Rwanda, who was nominated for Academy Award for Best Supporting Actress. Tatiana met with Okonedo before filming began to share details of her life.

References

External links 

1958 births
Living people
People from Butare
Tutsi people
Rwandan Roman Catholics
People of the Rwandan genocide
Rwandan humanitarians
Women humanitarians